The Roundhouse in Skierniewice  was built in 1845 and used until 1991. Currently the Polish Association of Railway Enthusiasts (PSMK) runs a museum exhibition here.

Exhibits (examples)
 Steam locomotives: Ty51, TKi3, Ol49, OKl27
 Diesel locomotives: LS40, SP30
 Electric locomotives: AEG 4184, EP03-08
 Freight cars
 Passenger rail cars
 Draisines
 Railway equipment

External links 
Official website PSMK (English)

Railway roundhouses in Poland
Buildings and structures in Skierniewice